Sort Of is a Canadian television sitcom, released on CBC Television in 2021. Created by Bilal Baig and Fab Filippo, the series stars Baig as Sabi Mehboob, a non-binary millennial trying to balance their roles as a child of Pakistani immigrant parents, a bartender at an LGBTQ bookstore and café, and a caregiver to the young children of a professional couple.

In February 2022, the series was renewed for a second season, which premiered on November 15 on CBC Television and CBC Gem in Canada and on HBO Max in the US on December 1. In December 2022, the series was renewed for a third season. The series has received positive reviews from critics and was the most-nominated television series at the 10th Canadian Screen Awards, winning the award for Best Comedy Series.

Cast and characters 
 Bilal Baig as Sabi Mehboob: A first generation Pakistani-Canadian trying to navigate life as they embrace their non-binary identity and combat the cultural expectations that have been put upon them, all while grappling with the severe injuries that their friend and employer, Bessy, has suffered.
 Gray Powell as Paul Bauer: Sabi's employer and husband to Bessy. He is a therapist who ironically has trouble noticing his own family's needs and struggles as well as his own. Much like Sabi, he is left to walk on his own path of self discovery and exploration in the wake of his wife's accident, often questioning how much he really knows about the lives of Bessy and their children.
 Kaya Kanashiro as Violet Kaneko-Bauer: Bessy and Paul's daughter and oldest child. She is entering a stage of rebellion as her mother's accident becomes increasingly more difficult to deal with emotionally.
 Aden Bedard as Henry Kaneko-Bauer: Bessy and Paul's son and youngest child. He is a mostly quiet kid who spends more time glued to his devices than looking up at people's faces.
 Amanda Cordner as 7ven: Sabi's best friend and confidant. When the opportunity to move to Berlin for a job in the art world arises, they invite Sabi to join on this new adventure in the "queer capital of the world" and leave their lives behind. 7ven is always pushing Sabi to embrace their identity and focus on their own needs rather than the needs of others. They don't always approve of how much Sabi's nannying consumes their life, but is always there to lend a hand when asked.
 Grace Lynn Kung as Bessy Kaneko: Sabi's employer and friend. An intellectual who feels constrained by the mold society imposes on a mother and a wife. Early in the series she has a biking accident which causes her to fall into a coma.
 Ellora Patnaik as Raffo Mehboob: Sabi and Aqsa's mother. A Pakistani immigrant living on her own as her two grown children have long moved out and her husband lives overseas. Though he may not be physically present, her husband–and the cultural values he represents–looms over her as she tries to understand her children better and, in the process, understand herself.
 Supinder Wraich as Aqsa Mehboob: Sabi's sister and roommate. Like her sibling, Aqsa tries to break away from her strict upbringing. She forms part of Sabi's support system, though at times their views on navigating their family's expectations and cultural beliefs differ.
 Gregory Ambrose Calderone as Lewis: Sabi's love interest at the onset of the series. He attempts to maintain a relationship with them while simultaneously feeling conflicted/ashamed of his partner's gender identity. 
Supporting cast also includes Becca Blackwell, Alanna Bale, and Cassandra James.

Production 
Sort Of was written by Baig, Filippo, Jenn Engels, Nelu Handa and Ian Iqbal Rashid, and directed by Filippo and Renuka Jeyapalan. Ian Iqbal Rashid and Jenn Engels were also co-executive producers.

The bookstore where Sabi works was inspired by Toronto's Glad Day Bookshop, an LGBTQ bookstore and café in the Church and Wellesley village, although the bookstore scenes in the series were filmed in a vacant space on Queen Street West.

Release 
The series launched on CBC Gem on 5 October 2021, in advance of its television premiere on 9 November. In advance of the CBC Gem launch, selected episodes received a preview screening in the Primetime program at the 2021 Toronto International Film Festival. In the United States, HBO Max picked up the series and premiered on 18 November 2021. The series has also been picked up by Sky Comedy in the United Kingdom, Stan in Australia (available from October 5), and M6 in France.

Episodes

Season 1 (2021)

Season 2 (2022)

Reception

Critical reception 
The first season received positive reviews from critics. On the review aggregation website Rotten Tomatoes, the season holds an approval rating of 100% with an average rating of 8.6 out of 10, based on 12 reviews. The second season holds an approval rating of 100% with an average rating of 8.0 out of 10, based on 6 reviews.

Accolades
Sort Of was nominated for the Outstanding New TV Series category for the 33rd GLAAD Media Awards in 2022. It also received a Peabody Award in the Entertainment category in 2022.

It was the most-nominated television series at the 10th Canadian Screen Awards in 2022, with 13 nominations. It won the award for Best Comedy Series. It was also shortlisted for the fan-voted Audience Choice Award.

Notes

References

2021 Canadian television series debuts
2020s Canadian sitcoms
2020s Canadian LGBT-related comedy television series
2020s Canadian workplace comedy television series
CBC Television original programming
Canadian LGBT-related sitcoms
Television shows filmed in Toronto
Transgender-related television shows
Pakistani-Canadian culture
English-language television shows
Television series about immigration in Canada
Gemini and Canadian Screen Award for Best Comedy Series winners